Jovan Golić (born 18 September 1986) is a Serbian football coach and a former player. He is an assistant coach with Inđija.

Career
born in Vlasenica, SR Bosnia and Herzegovina, Golić joined the youth team of FK Boksit Milići in 1992 and played there till 2001 when he moved to Serbia and joined the youth team of FK Proleter Zrenjanin. After one season with Proleter, he joined FK Mladost Lukićevo playing in Serbian League (third tier) where he debuted as senior in the 2002–03 season. In summer 2005 he moved to OFK Bačka from Bačka Palanka, and after a year and a half he moved to FK Inđija playing with them till summer 2010 when they achieved promotion to the Serbian SuperLiga. However Golić that summer capitalised this highlight and instead of getting a chance to play with the club in Serbian highest level, he accepted a lucrative offer from Russian Premier League side PFC Spartak Nalchik where he had already played half-season on loan from Inđija. He played two season in Russian top-flight with Nalchik and next he moved to Romania signing with CS Turnu Severin.

In December 2013, Golić was in Kazakhstan top league and he moved from FC Atyrau to FC Taraz.

References

External links
 
 Profile and stats on Srbijafudbal
 
 

1986 births
People from Milići
Living people
Serbian footballers
Association football midfielders
FK Proleter Zrenjanin players
OFK Bačka players
FK Inđija players
PFC Spartak Nalchik players
CS Turnu Severin players
FC Atyrau players
FC Taraz players
Serbian First League players
Russian Premier League players
Liga I players
Kazakhstan Premier League players
Serbian expatriate footballers
Expatriate footballers in Russia
Serbian expatriate sportspeople in Russia
Expatriate footballers in Romania
Serbian expatriate sportspeople in Romania
Expatriate footballers in Kazakhstan
Serbian expatriate sportspeople in Kazakhstan
Serbian football managers